Toms Run may refer to:

Toms Run (Twin Creek), a stream in Ohio
Toms Run (Clarion River), a stream in Pennsylvania
Toms Run (New River), a stream in West Virginia

See also
Little Toms Run